The 1967–68 season saw Rochdale compete for their 9th consecutive season in the Football League Fourth Division.

Statistics
																																
																																

|}

Final League Table

Competitions

Football League Fourth Division

F.A. Cup

League Cup

Lancashire Cup

Northern Floodlit Cup

Rose Bowl

References

Rochdale A.F.C. seasons
Rochdale